Tony Clarke (born 31 May 1959) is a New Zealand former sports shooter. He competed in the men's 50 metre running target event at the 1984 Summer Olympics.

References

External links
 

1959 births
Living people
New Zealand male sport shooters
Olympic shooters of New Zealand
Shooters at the 1984 Summer Olympics
Sportspeople from Auckland
Commonwealth Games medallists in shooting
Commonwealth Games gold medallists for New Zealand
Commonwealth Games bronze medallists for New Zealand
Shooters at the 1990 Commonwealth Games
Shooters at the 1994 Commonwealth Games
20th-century New Zealand people
21st-century New Zealand people
Medallists at the 1990 Commonwealth Games